Gerhard Jäger (born 8 February 1958) is a former Austrian alpine skier.

Career
During his career he has achieved 9 results among the top 10 (2 podiums) in the World Cup.

World Cup results
Top 10

References

External links
 
 

1958 births
Living people
Austrian male alpine skiers
20th-century Austrian people